The Roman Catholic Diocese of Mar del Plata is in Argentina and is a suffragan of the Archdiocese of La Plata.

History
On 11 February 1957, Pope Pius XII established the Diocese of Mar del Plata from the Diocese of Bahía Blanca and the Archdiocese of La Plata.  Territory was taken from the diocese in 1980 to form the Diocese of Chascomús.

Bishops

Ordinaries
Enrique Rau (1957–1971)
Eduardo Francisco Pironio (1972–1975), appointed titular Archbishop and Pro-Prefect of the Congregation for Religious and Secular Institutes (Cardinal in 1976)
Rómulo García (1976–1991), appointed Archbishop of Bahía Blanca
José María Arancedo (1991–2003), appointed Archbishop of Santa Fe de la Vera Cruz
Juan Alberto Puiggari (2003–2010), appointed Archbishop of Paraná
Antonio Marino (2011-2017)
Gabriel Antonio Mestre (2017-)

Auxiliary bishops
Rómulo García (1975–1976), appointed Bishop here
Dario Rubén Quintana, O.A.R. (2019-)

Territorial losses

References

Roman Catholic dioceses in Argentina
Roman Catholic Ecclesiastical Province of La Plata
Christian organizations established in 1957
Roman Catholic dioceses and prelatures established in the 20th century
Mar del Plata